Mudry is a Slavic surname, particularly Ukrainian and Slovak, with the meaning "wise". When applied to a woman it will often take the feminine form "Mudra".

People
 Jaroslav I. Múdry  (c. 978 – 20 February 1054) (Yaroslav the Wise), Grand Prince of Rus'
Auguste Mudry  (17 July 1917 - 5 August 2006) French aircraft designer.
 Hilda Múdra (born January 1, 1926) Austrian-born Slovak figure skating coach. 
 Melanie Mudry (born March 16, 1981), married name Melanie Mudry Varian, was Miss Connecticut USA in 2007.
 Sofron Stefan Mudry, O.S.B.M (1923–2014) is a Ukrainian Bishop of the Ukrainian Catholic Church.
 Vasyl Mudry (1893–1966), Ukrainian journalist and politician

Other
  Avions Mudry: a French aircraft company which became part of Apex Aircraft, now part of Robin Aircraft. 
 Mudry CAP 10: a two-seat training aerobatic aircraft first built in 1970.
 Mudry CAP 20: a French family of aerobatic competition single seater monoplanes.
 Mudry CAP 230: a family of aircraft designed for competition aerobatics.

See also
 

Surnames
Slovak-language surnames
Ukrainian-language surnames